The Mohave Trail was a Native American trade route between Mohave Indian villages on the Colorado River and settlements in coastal Southern California.

History
Starting from Mohave villages along the Colorado River in the upper Mohave Valley, the Mohave Trail  ran westward between springs across the Mojave Desert, from Piute Spring to Indian Well, to Rock Springs, then to Marl Spring and Soda Spring on the west side of Soda Lake. From there the trail led to the mouth of the Mojave River southwest of Soda Lake.  It then followed the river up stream, finding oases of water and vegetation where the river came to the surface at various places along its course.

At what is now Summit Valley, the trail turned upward into and over the San Bernardino Mountains at Monument Peak, then descended into the San Bernardino Valley at the mouth of Cajon Canyon.

Spanish and American era
The Franciscan missionary Francisco Garcés was the first European to travel and report on the route in 1776.  The Mohave Trail later became the route of raiders, preying on the herds of the California missions and ranchos. Spanish (and later, Mexican) soldiers pursued the raiders along the route.

The Mohave Trail was later used by the first Americans to reach Alta California by land, the expedition of fur trappers led by Jedediah Smith in November, 1826.  Subsequently, from 1829 to 1848, New Mexican and American merchants used much of the length of the trail westward from Piute Spring as part of the main route of the Old Spanish Trail trade routes.   
 	
In 1847 - 1848, Mormons from Salt Lake City and from Los Angeles opened up a wagon road route between the Mormon settlements near Salt Lake City, Utah and Los Angeles in Southern California,  This route intercepted and then  followed the Old Spanish Trail from Utah.  It met the old Mojave Trail where the Mormon Road joined it at Fork of the Road on the Mojave River and followed the trail along the river upstream until its Last Crossing before leaving the old trail and crossing 17 miles of desert to Cajon Pass.  From 1849, the Mormon Road became heavily traveled winter road to California by Forty-niners seeking to avoid the fate of the Donner Party, and subsequent travelers, post riders and commercial wagon freighters.

In 1857, the route of the old trail was part of the route that linked Beale's Wagon Road route, across the Mojave Desert from Fort Tejon, to where they met at Beale's Crossing on the Colorado River.  This ran from the Colorado crossing to where it left the Mojave River, west of the vicinity of modern Barstow.  In 1858, during the Mohave War the old native footpath and pack trail between Fork of the Road and the Colorado River was converted into the Mojave Road, a wagon road to supply the newly established Fort Mohave from Los Angeles.  During the Colorado River Gold Rush from 1862 it became one of the major roads to the gold and silver mining regions on the upper river and linked by the Hardyville - Prescott Road in 1864 to the mining regions in northern and central Arizona.

In the 21st century
The eastern Mojave Desert route of the Mohave Trail, from Manix Wash east to the Colorado River is now closely followed by a jeep trail called the Mojave Road.

References

 
Native American trails in the United States
Native American history of California
History of the Great Basin
Trails and roads in the American Old West
Historic trails and roads in California
Pre-statehood history of California
The Californias
Mexican California